The following are the telephone codes in Gabon.

Calling formats
The NSN length is seven digits. To call Gabon, the following format is used:
 0X XX XX XX - calling within Gabon
 +241 0X XX XX XX - calling from outside Gabon

As from 0000 hours on 12 July 2019:

- current 01 71 71 71 becomes 011 71 71 71;
- current 02 04 04 04 becomes 062 04 04 04;
- current 04 08 14 14 becomes 074 08 14 14;
- current 05 05 05 05 becomes 065 05 05 05;
- current 06 11 11 11 becomes 066 11 11 11;
- current 07 28 01 50 becomes 077 28 01 50.

For any additional information, please contact the call centres on the following numbers: 222 (Libertis and Moov), 111 (AIRTEL) and 8484 (ARCEP).

List of allocations in Gabon
A new number plan took effect in 2012.

References

Gabon
Telecommunications in Gabon
Telephone numbers